The Cellar Door Sessions 1970 is a boxed live album released in 2005. It was recorded over several nights in 1970 at the Washington D. C. nightclub The Cellar Door. Despite similar formatting to The Miles Davis Series of box sets, it is not part of that series.

Significant portions of Davis' Live-Evil were edited and compiled from the music that appears on discs 5 and 6. The sections labelled "Improvisation" into "Imamorata" are most commonly known as "Funky Tonk", but were released on Live-Evil as "Imamorata and Narration by Conrad Roberts".

Live-Evil and this collection are the only official recordings of John McLaughlin's live performances with Miles Davis.

Track listing 
Columbia and Legacy – C6K 93614

Personnel 
 Miles Davis - electric trumpet with wah-wah
 Gary Bartz - soprano sax and alto sax, flute
 Keith Jarrett - Fender Rhodes electric piano, Fender Contempo organ
 Michael Henderson - electric bass
 Jack DeJohnette - drums
 Airto Moreira - percussion, cuica (CDs 2, 3, 4, 5, 6)
Guest musician:
 John McLaughlin - electric guitar (CDs 5, 6 only)

References

Albums produced by Teo Macero
Miles Davis live albums
1970 live albums
2005 live albums
2005 compilation albums
Columbia Records compilation albums
Columbia Records live albums
Legacy Recordings live albums